The Asian Electronic Sports Federation (AESF) is the governing body of Esports in Asia and recognized by Olympic Council of Asia.

Members
So far, there are 45 member nations in AESF:

References

External links
 

Esports governing bodies
Sports governing bodies in Asia
Sports organizations established in 2018